Hysterura is a genus of moths in the family Geometridae described by Warren in 1895.

Species
Hysterura cervinaria Moore, 1868
Hysterura declinans (Staudinger, 1897)
Hysterura declinans bergmani Bryk, 1949
Hysterura hypischyra Prout, 1937
Hysterura literataria Leech, 1897
Hysterura multifaria (Swinhoe, 1889)
Hysterura protagma Prout, 1940
Hysterura protagma agaura Prout, 1940
Hysterura vacillans Prout, 1940

References

Cidariini